Hongcao Road is a station on the Shanghai Metro, which services Line 12 and opened on December 19, 2015.

References

Railway stations in Shanghai
Line 12, Shanghai Metro
Shanghai Metro stations in Xuhui District
Railway stations in China opened in 2015